Spices are plant substances used for flavoring as a food additive.

Spice or SPICE may also refer to:

Organizations
 Spice Engineering, a British racing team
 Spice Telecom, a former Indian telecommunications company
 Spice Network, a group of adult television channels
 Susan Polgar Institute of Chess Excellence

Popular culture

Fiction
 Melange (fictional drug) or "the spice", a drug in the Dune novels by Frank Herbert
Spice, a drug in the Star Wars universe

Surname
 Gordon Spice (born 1940), a British former racing driver
 Richie Spice (born 1971), a Jamaican reggae artist (also Richell Bonner)

Music
 Spice (musician) (born 1982), a Jamaican dancehall artist
 Spice (British band), a 1960s rock band
 Spice (Canadian band), a Canadian pop and folk band
 Spice, a percussionist for the band Dread Zeppelin
 Spice 1, an American rapper
 Spice Girls, a 1990s pop girl group
 Spice (album), a 1996 album by the girl group Spice Girls
 "Spice" (song), a 2011 song by the girl group Perfume

Slang
 Spice, a slang term for synthetic cannabinoids (also known as synthetic marijuana)

Religion
SPICE or SPICES, an acronym representing the principle testimonies in Quaker practical theology

Science and technology

Communications, circuitry and electronics
 SPICE, an electronic circuit simulator
 SPICE (protocol), a remote-connection sharing protocol
 Spacecraft Planet Instrument C-matrix Events, a NASA space mission geometry software system
 Software Process Improvement and Capability Determination, ISO 15504, a process-assessment framework
 Small Projects in a Controlled Environment, a reduced version of PRINCE2 for managing small projects
 Motorola Spice, a smartphone developed by Motorola
 Space Internetworking Center, a Greek research center focused on space communications

Other physics
 Stratospheric Particle Injection for Climate Engineering, a UK solar geoengineering research project
 Spice (oceanography)
 Bautek Spice, a German hang glider
 Spice (bomb), a bomb guidance device